Rhaphicera is a genus of butterflies of the family Nymphalidae found in the Indomalayan realm (India and China).

Species
Listed alphabetically:
 Rhaphicera dumicola western China
 Rhaphicera moorei
 Rhaphicera satricus

References

External links
Images representing Rhaphicera at Consortium for the Barcode of Life

Satyrini
Butterfly genera
Taxa named by Arthur Gardiner Butler